Childhood absence epilepsy (CAE), is one of the most frequent pediatric epilepsy syndromes. CAE is an idiopathic generalized epilepsy that occurs in otherwise normal children. The only seizure type at the time of diagnosis is the typical absence seizure. CAE is a well-known pediatric epilepsy syndrome affecting 10–17% of all children with epilepsy. It was previously known as pyknolepsy. The word pyknolepsy originates from the Greek piknoz (picnós), which means recurrent or grouped. The usual age of onset of CAE is between 4 and 10 years, with peak between 5 and 7 years.

The typical absence seizure has a sudden onset of altered awareness and ends also abruptly. Electroencephalogram demonstrate characteristic "typical 3Hz spike-wave" generalized rhythmic discharges that begin and end abruptly. Prognosis is generally good with fair rates of response to treatment and with most patients growing out of their absencese. However, learning difficulties and seizure occurrence rates remain higher than the general population even after several years. When typical absence seizures start the age of 8– 9 years old when the absence seizures are infrequent or when the absence seizures are observed in a patient that had experienced a generalized tonic-clonic seizure, a diagnosis of juvenile absence epilepsy should be considered.

Signs and symptoms
CAE is characterized by the presence of absence seizures. The absence seizures are usually brief (about 4 to 30 seconds) but occur frequently, usually around a dozen per day but sometimes even hundreds of times per day. They involve abrupt impairment of consciousness with loss of awareness and responsiveness, behavioral arrest, and arrest of the activity that may vary from complete arrest to continuing the activity with an altered status. Other seizure features include starring, eyelid movement or eye-opening and pallor. Mild automatisms and mild movements at the beginning of the seizures are frequent, but major motor involvement, as atonic falls, early in the course of the disease excludes this diagnosis.

The International League Against Epilepsy commission defined absence seizure as “of sudden onset, interruption of ongoing activities, staring, possible upwards version of eyes with few seconds duration, associated with symmetrical 2–4 Hz, mainly 3 Hz spike-wave complexes, normal background activity. Absence seizure was divided into two subgroups (Penry et al. 1975), first with consciousness impairment, and others were associated with the other clinical component, namely clonic, atonic, tonic, autonomic, and with automatisms. Though CAE usually occurs in children with normal neurodevelopment and are sensitive to antiepileptic treatments children with CAE have a risk of academic failure and high rates of attention deficits.

Neuropsychological impairment
Neuropsychological impairment in children with CAE is frequent and includes executive dysfunction, attention problems, learning disabilities, and language problems. These problems even persist after seizures are treated. Monitoring with validated cognition scales should be performed. Many existing data illustrate that children with CAE have an average IQ but present subtle cognitive difficulties. In cases with lower IQ, significant social difficulties can be often seen. Behavioral issues may also be present and their occurrence might be associated with significantly worse cognitive development. Some evidence suggest that  are impairment is more prominent in verbal rather than non-verbal capacities of children with CAE  or are even limited to few areas of verbal expression as phonological and category fluency. Attention deficit disorder and specific learning disorders are also frequently found in the CAE and can interfere with academic performance as well as with day to day activities of the children.

Causes
CAE is considered as a complex polygenic disorder. This fact is supported by the high occurrence (up to 20%) of generalized epilepsies or febrile seizures in family members of children with CAE. In cases with early onset or accompanying features, Glut-1 deficiency (a metabolic disorder responding well to ketogenic diet) could be the cause of the absence seizures. Genetic mutations have been identified in recent years involving mainly GABA receptors and calcium channel modulator genes.

Pathophysiology
Pathophysiology of absence seizures has been widely studied in animal models but is not fully decoded to date. There is however solid evidence for the involvement of bilateral cortical and subcortical networks which are part of the default state system. Pathophysiology when genetic mutations are present is further discussed below. Particularly in the Han Chinese population, there is an association between mutations in the calcium channel, voltage-dependent, T type, alpha 1H subunit (CACNA1H), and childhood absence epilepsy. These mutations cause increased channel activity and associated increased neuronal excitability. Seizures are believed to originate in the thalamus, where there is an abundance of T-type calcium channels such as those encoded by the CACNA1H gene (12). In a European study CACNA1H associated with CAE, 20 mutations have been identified. These mutations are likely not wholly causative and should instead be thought of as giving susceptibility. This is particularly true since some groups have found no connection between CAE and CACNA1H mutations. Many of the CACNA1H mutations have a measurable effect on channel kinetics on activation time constant and voltage dependence, on deactivation time constant, and on inactivation time constant and voltage dependence. should leading either to neuronal excitability or hypo excitability. However, these predictions result from mathematical modeling and may differ from what occurs in neurons (in vivo) where other proteins, some of which may interact with CACNA1H, are present. Along with mutations in the CACNA1H gene, two mutations in gamma-aminobutyric acid receptor subunit gamma-2 (GABRG2), the gene encoding a GABAA receptor gamma subunit, are also associated with a CAE-like phenotype that also overlaps with generalized epilepsy with febrile seizures plus type-3. The first of these, R43Q, abolishes benzodiazepine potentiation of gamma-aminobutyric acid induced currents. The second associated mutation, C588T, has not been further characterized.

Diagnosis
CAE can be diagnosed during an outpatient clinic visit with a careful history, physical exam including hyperventilation, and a routine electroencephalogram. The diagnosis is made upon the history of absence seizures during early childhood without other seizure types and the observation of 3 Hz generalized spike waves paroxysmal discharges on the EEG. In children with CAE without atypical features electroclinical features, no neuroimaging is needed.

Management
There are three antiepileptic drugs that have been used for the first-line treatment for CAE; these are ethosuximide (ETX), valproic acid (VPA), and lamotrigine (LTG). ETX is an effective first-line treatment for seizures only by blocking the low-threshold calcium currents produced by T-type calcium channels in the thalamus. The peak level occurs after 3–5 hours of intake; steady levels of the drug in the blood are achieved after 7–10 days of the same daily dose. The usual dosage is 20–30 mg/kg/day divided into two doses. Common side effects include gastrointestinal disturbances such as hiccups, vomiting, abdominal discomfort, and diarrheic and exceptionally. The other symptoms, like fatigue, insomnia, dizziness and ataxia. Valproate (VPA) has also been proven effective monotherapy in CAE although ETX is usually preferred as it has a lower impact on attention according to the Childhood Epilepsy study. There are several mechanisms related to VPA’s antiepileptic action, including raising the level of gamma-aminobutyric acid (GABA), calcium-dependent potassium activating, and blocking of voltage-sensitive sodium channels, but there is no specific evidence for the mechanism by which VPA controls absence seizures. VPA also has a wide range of side effects, like high-frequency tremor, altered mental status, increased appetite and weight gain, pancreatitis, and hepatic failure, thrombocytopenia, teratogenesis during pregnancy, although serious side effects are rare and usually dose-dependent. Usual maintenance dose in children is 20–30 mg/kg/day. Lamotrigine (LTG) could be can be used as alternative add-on treatment for CAE along with VPA and ETX. Other possible treatments in the rare cases of pharmacoresistant include levetiracetam, clobazam, topiramate, zonisamide.

Epidemiology
The occurrence of absence seizures varies from 0.7 to 4.6/100,000 in the overall population and from 6 to 8/100,000 in children up to 15 years old. There is some evidence showing that girls are more frequently affected by CAE than boys.

See also
 Generalized epilepsy with febrile seizures plus
 Calcium channel
 Spike and Wave

References

Footnotes

External links

Channelopathies
Epilepsy types
Seizure types